Nørvøya or Nørve is an island in Ålesund Municipality in Møre og Romsdal county, Norway. It is the largest of the islands containing the city center of Ålesund, the others being Aspøya and Heissa, located to the west. There were 9,647 residents living on the island in 2015.

Ålesund University College, the city hall, Volsdalen Church, and the stadium of the local association football team Aalesunds FK are located on Nørvøya.  The  hill Aksla, a popular place from where to photograph the city, is located on the western part of Nørvøya.  The European route E136 highway runs along the south side of the island, connecting it to the other islands of Oksenøya (on the east) and Aspøya (on the west).  On Nørvøya, the E136 highway connects to the Ellingsøy Tunnel, which is an undersea tunnel that connects to the village of Hoffland on Ellingsøya to the north.

See also
List of islands of Norway

References

Ålesund
Islands of Møre og Romsdal